Otradnoye is a rural locality (a settlement) and the administrative center of Otradnenskoye Rural Settlement, Novousmansky District, Voronezh Oblast, Russia. The population was  4,581 as of 2010. There are 104 streets.

Geography 
Otradnoye is located 11 km northwest of Novaya Usman (the district's administrative centre) by road. Gololobovo is the nearest rural locality.

References 

Rural localities in Novousmansky District